DEU may refer to:

Deutsche Eislauf-Union, the figure skating governing body in Germany
Diccionario del español del Uruguay, the Dictionary of Uruguayan Spanish
distinctive environmental uniform, the current uniform of the Canadian Forces, adopted in the late 1980s
Doom Editing Utility, a software utility for the computer game Doom
 The ISO 3166-1 alpha-3 country code for Germany (German Deutschland)
 The ISO 639-2 (T) and ISO 639-3 code for Standard High German
 Drug Enforcement Unit, a specialised police unit
Dokuz Eylül University, a state university located in Izmir, Turkey